Wosso or Wasso, aka Owosso, was a 19th-century Ojibwa leader of the Shiawassee band.  

Wosso was a signatory of the Treaty of Saginaw in 1819 which ceded 24,000 square kilometers (or more than six million acres) in central Michigan to the US government. He was also a signatory of the Treaty of Detroit in 1807 which ceded much of southeastern Michigan and northwest Ohio to the US government.

The city of Owosso, Michigan is named for him.

References

Ojibwe people
Native American leaders
19th-century Native Americans
Year of birth missing
Year of death missing
Native American people from Michigan